Kravchuk is a surname that derived from the occupation of tailor (kravets) with addition of a common Ukrainian suffix -chuk.

The name may refer to:

Andrei Kravchuk (born 1962), Russian director and screenwriter
Andriy Kravchuk (born 1999), Ukrainian football player
Antonina Kravchuk (born 1935), Ukrainian economician, First Lady of Ukraine (1991–1994)
Danylo Kravchuk (born 2001), Ukrainian football player
Igor Kravchuk (born 1966), Russian ice hockey player
Konstantin Kravchuk (born 1985), Russian tennis player
Leonid Kravchuk (1934–2022), first President of Ukraine
Mikhail Kravchuk (born 1991), Belarusian football player
Mykhailo Kravchuk (1892–1942), Ukrainian mathematician
Petro Kravchuk (1962–2022), Ukrainian politician
Robert Kravchuk (born 1955), American financial and political scholar
Stanislav Kravchuk (born 1978), Ukrainian freestyle skier
Valentyn Kravchuk (1944—2003), Ukrainian rower
Valery Kravchuk (born 1955), Ukrainian heavyweight weightlifter
Yevheniya Kravchuk (born 1985), Ukrainian politician

See also
 

Ukrainian-language surnames
Occupational surnames
Surnames of Ukrainian origin